Mixed anion compounds, heteroanionic materials or mixed anion materials are chemical compounds containing cations and more than one kind of anion. The compounds contain a single phase, rather than just a mixture.

Use in materials science
By having more than one anion, many more compounds can be made, and properties tuned to desirable values.
In terms of optics, properties include laser damage threshold, refractive index, birefringence, absorption particularly in the ultraviolet or near infrared, non-linearity.
Mechanical properties can include ability to grow a large crystal, ability to form a thin layer, strength, or brittleness.

Thermal properties can include melting point, thermal stability, phase transition temperatures,  Thermal expansion coefficient.

For electrical properties, electric conductivity, band gap, superconducting transition temperature piezoelectricity, pyroelectricity, ferromagnetism, dielectric constant, charge-density wave transition can be adjusted.

Production
Many of the non-metals that could make mixed anion compounds may have greatly varying volatilities. This makes it more difficult to combine the elements together. Compounds may be produced in a solid state reaction, by heating solids together, either in a vacuum or a gas. Common gases used include, oxygen, hydrogen, ammonia, chlorine, fluorine, hydrogen sulfide, or carbon disulfide. Soft chemical approaches to manufacture include solvothermal synthesis, or substituting atoms in a structure by others, including by water, oxygen, fluorine or nitrogen. Teflon pouches can be used to separate different formulations. Thin film deposits can yield strained layers. High pressures can be used to prevent evaporation of volatiles. High pressure can result in different crystal forms, perhaps with higher coordination number.

Kinds

Elemental
 pnictochalcogenides
 oxypnictides, including oxynitrides, oxyphosphides, oxyarsenides, oxyantimonides, and oxybismuthides
 chalcohalides or chalcogenide halides
 oxyhalides, including oxyfluorides, oxychlorides, oxybromides, and oxyiodides
 fluorosulfides
 sulfide chlorides, selenide chlorides, and telluride chlorides
 sulfide bromides, selenide bromides, and telluride bromides
 sulfide iodides, selenide iodides, and telluride iodides
 oxysulfides and oxyselenides
 oxyhydrides
 halopnictides
 fluoropnictides, including fluorophosphides, fluoroarsenides, fluoroantimonides, and fluorobismuthides

Molecular anions
 borohydride-chloride
 disulfide dithioorthovanadate

Oxyanions
 halocarbonates, including carbonate fluorides, carbonate chlorides, and carbonate bromides
 phosphates, including fluoride phosphates, chloride phosphate, phosphate molybdates, and phosphate arsenates
 borates
 halide borates, including fluoride borates borate chlorides, borate bromides and borate iodides
 chalcogenide borates, including sulfide borates
 borate carbonates, borate nitrates, borate sulfates, borate phosphates
 borate acetates
 Condensed borates: borosulfates, boroselenates, borotellurates, boroantimonates, borophosphates, boroselenites
 sulfates
 sulfate fluorides and sulfate chlorides
 sulfate arsenate
 selenite fluorides
 iodate fluorides,
 Silicates
 sulfide silicates

Fluoroanions

Mixed valency and oligomers
Some elements can form several different kinds of anions, and compounds may exist with more than one. Examples include the iodate periodates, sulfite sulfates and selenite selenates. These kinds also include different oligomeric forms such as phosphates or fluorotitanates, such as [Ti4F20]4- and [TiF5]−.

Organic
 borate acetate
 oxalate formate

References

 
Physical chemistry